Edward Joseph Dent (16 July 1876 – 22 August 1957), generally known as Edward J. Dent, was an English musicologist, teacher, translator and critic. A leading figure of musicology and music criticism, Dent was Professor of Music at the University of Cambridge between 1926 and 1941.

Life
Dent was born in Ribston, Yorkshire, the son of the landowner and politician John Dent.  He was educated at Bilston Grange, and Eton where he was a music student of Charles Harford Lloyd. He matriculated at King's College, Cambridge in 1895, graduating B.A. in 1898 in the Classical Tripos, Mus.B. 1899 having studied under Charles Wood and Charles Villiers Stanford, and M.A. 1902. He was elected a Fellow of his college in March 1902 having distinguished himself in music both as researcher and a composer.

Dent was Professor of Music at Cambridge University from 1926 to 1941, where his students included Arthur Bliss, Arnold Cooke and Cecil Armstrong Gibbs. He was President of the I.S.C.M. from its foundation in 1922 until 1938 and was President of the International Music Society between 1931 and 1949. He was a governor of Sadler's Wells Opera, and translated many libretti for it. He wrote influential books on Alessandro Scarlatti, Ferruccio Busoni, Handel, English operas and the operas of Mozart.

Legacy
He died in London, aged 81.

The music writer and critic Arthur Jacobs commended Dent's opera translations, which "at their best, whether in colloquial or lofty style (The Barber of Seville, The Trojans), reduce me to despair at nearly all later translators' efforts, including my own". Dent "saw opera as a people's possession. Totally pro-opera-in-English, totally pro-theatrical, anti-snob and indifferent to stars, he wrote: 'The more I frequent opera, the more keenly I am interested in the work itself and its presentation as a whole, and the more indifferent I am to its individual parts'."

The character Philip Herriton in E. M. Forster's novel Where Angels Fear to Tread (1905) was based on Dent. The tenor Clive Carey was another friend, and the two exchanged over 400 letters over many years. The "informal biography" Duet for Two Voices by Hugh Carey was published in 1979, based on the letters. A new biography by Karen Arrandale was published in January 2023.

Selected publications
Alessandro Scarlatti, his life and works, 1905.
Mozart's operas, 1913.
Foundations of English opera
Ferruccio Busoni
A life of Handel
Opera. Penguin, 1940.

References

Sources
 Arrundale, Karen. 'The Scholar as Critic: Edward J Dent' in Dibble, J. (ed.) British Musical Criticism and Intellectual Thought, 1850-1950, Boydell Press (2018)

Further reading

External links

 
 
 
texts of Busoni songs, the last of which is an epistle to "Caro Dent"

1876 births
1957 deaths
English musicologists
Opera scholarship
Alumni of King's College, Cambridge
International Musicological Society presidents
Opera managers
Mozart scholars
Fellows of King's College, Cambridge
People educated at Eton College
English music critics
British music critics
Classical music critics
Handel scholars
People educated at Bilton Grange
Professors of Music (Cambridge)